The Jordan Women's Pro League is the main women's football tournament in Jordan. It was first contested in 2005. The league has been known under names throughout its history: 1st Women's League in 2005, Orange A League between 2013 and 2015, Division 1 from 2015–16 to 2018, and Jordan Women's Pro League since the 2019 season.

Teams
The top clubs draw up to 500 spectators per game.

Category A includes Shabab Al Ordon, Orthodoxi, Amman, and Zarqa.

Category B includes Petra, Kufor Rakeb, Al Esteqlal, and Al Hussein.

Format
It is played as a round-robin with the top four teams after that advancing to the play-offs.

Champions
The champions so far are:

2005–06: Shabab Al-Ordon
2006–07: Shabab Al-Ordon
2007–08: Shabab Al-Ordon
2008–09: Shabab Al-Ordon
2009–10: Shabab Al-Ordon
2010–11: Amman
2011–12: Shabab Al-Ordon
2012–13: not held
2013–14: Shabab Al-Ordon
2014–15: Amman 
2015–16: Shabab Al-Ordon
2016–17: Amman
2018: abandoned
2019: Shabab Al-Ordon
2020: Amman
2021: Amman

See also
 AFC Women's Club Championship

References

External links
League at soccerway.com
Jordan Football Association

Jordan
Women
league
Women's sports leagues in Jordan
2005 establishments in Jordan